Saint-Hubert is a borough in the city of Longueuil, located in the Montérégie region of Quebec, Canada. It had been a separate city prior to January 1, 2002, when it along with several other neighbouring south shore municipalities were merged into Longueuil. Saint-Hubert had a population of 78,336 in 2006. Longueuil's city hall is now located in Saint-Hubert.

The borough has a wide array of commercial, industrial and agricultural enterprises. The aerospace industry is arguably the most important of these enterprises. Pratt & Whitney Canada designs and manufactures jet engines at a plant near Saint-Hubert Airport. The Canadian Space Agency has its head office in the borough. The École nationale d'aérotechnique, a school that teaches aeronautics is located in the borough and operated by Collège Édouard-Montpetit.

History

The city's namesake is derived from Hubertus,  who later became commonly known as St. Hubert. It was originally established as a parish in 1860, and was granted official city status in 1958.

In 1971, the former city of Laflèche (previously known as Mackayville), merged with the city of Saint-Hubert.

October Crisis
At the height of the 1970 October Crisis, Quebec Labour Minister Pierre Laporte was kidnapped from his Saint-Lambert, Quebec home and held at Saint-Hubert Airport. The city of Saint-Hubert, like many other Quebec municipalities, named a park in his honour, Parc Pierre-Laporte.

Recent history
In 1992, the city began work on the creation of a large park, to be known as Parc de la Cité. It is located in the heart of the city and includes a one-kilometre long man-made lake.
Croydon - Was part of St-Hubert from 0 Montée St-Hubert to Orchard ( St. Andres st) to Grande Allée to Maricourt.

Politics

It is split between the Vachon and Laporte (Laflèche) provincial electoral districts. Vachon's Member of the National Assembly is Martine Ouellet of the Parti Québécois. Laporte's Member of the National Assembly is Nicole Ménard of the Quebec Liberal Party.

It is composed of five municipal districts, each with a city councillor. The borough president is Lorraine Guay-Boivin of Action Longueuil.

Economy
Pascan Aviation has its headquarters in Saint-Hubert.

Neighbourhoods
Today, there are four distinct sectors of Saint-Hubert:
 Iberville
 Laflèche
 Laurendeau
 Maricourt

Historic neighbourhoods
The following is a list of localities within the borough of Saint-Hubert.

Brentwood
Brentwood was located in between Rue Kimber and Chemin Chambly. Chemin Noble was among the main streets in the area, with Cousineau Boulevard becoming important much later on. Chemin Noble was named for Benjamin Noble, superintendent and resident of the area, upon its founding in the late 1910s. Brentwood was considered a "summer hideaway" by many Montrealers. It had no streets, electricity or telephone service. A small "hut-like" train station was located next to the railroad tracks and provided service to Montreal via the Montreal and Southern Counties Railway.

Brookline
Brookline was also located in between Rue Kimber and Chemin Chambly. Mountainview Boulevard was the locale's main street, with Cousineau Boulevard becoming a major artery much later on. Brookline was an anglophone working-class area. The tramway station was located on the southwest part of the railroad tracks, between Rue Rideau and Rue Léonard.

Castle Gardens
Castle Gardens was the smallest of Saint-Hubert's neighbourhoods. It was located in between the CN railway line, and Grande-Allée (formerly known as Chemin de la Côte-Noire), in between Rue Canon and Rue Jonergin (originally known as Ireland Street).

Croydon
Croydon, or St. Lambert Annex, was a large neighbourhood located along Montée Saint-Hubert from Grande Allée to Boulevard de Maricourt at the railroad tracks. Along the railroad tracks, it stretched from Montée Saint-Hubert to Rue Donat, while its borders became smaller closer to Grande Alleé. It was an English-speaking working-class area. Croydon's limits expanded in 1935 to include Castle Gardens.

East Greenfield
East Greenfield was located in close proximity to what is today known as the Litchfield Industrial Park. It stretched from Grande-Allée to Boulevard de Maricourt. The following streets ran north–south: Cornwall, Wesley, Quévillon, Kensington, Belmont, Nantel, Campbell. Perpendicular to these streets were Barlow, Milligan, Viateur, Lalande, Mcrae, Spriggs and Robinson. In 1935, its boundaries were extended to the nearby municipality of Saint-Joseph de Chambly. The 1935 census indicated that the majority of residents along Grande-Allée were francophone, while the rest of the area had a substantial anglophone population. The area was served by St. Stephen Anglican Church and Wesley United Church.

Pinehurst
Pinehurst was located east of to East Greenfield, and could be accessed by Rue Cornwall. This area started to develop in the mid-1910s.

Springfield Park
Springfield Park was located in between Rue Kimber and Boulevard Cousineau. It was originally an English-speaking rural area served by the Montreal and Southern Counties Railway. Today it is primarily a French-speaking suburban area. Springfield Street, now known as Prince Charles Street, was the neighbourhood's main street.

Demographics

Education

Post Secondary
French-language
École nationale d'aérotechnique (Collège Édouard-Montpetit)

Secondary
English-language
 Heritage Regional High School
Royal George (closed)
French-language
 École Secondaire André-Laurendeau
 École Secondaire Mgr-A.-M.-Parent

Primary
 English-language
 Kensington Elementary (closed)
 Royal Charles Elementary
 Royal Oak Elementary (closed)
 Terry Fox Elementary
 Vincent Massey (closed)

 French-language
 Ecole Primaire Charles-LeMoyne
 Ecole Primaire de La Mosaïque
 Ecole Primaire De Maricourt
 Ecole Primaire des Mille-Fleurs
 Ecole Primaire des Quatre-Saisons
 Ecole Primaire des Quatre-Vents (closed)
 Ecole Primaire D'Iberville
 Ecole Primaire Du Jardin-Bienville
 Ecole Primaire Gaétan-Boucher
 Ecole Primaire Laurent-Benoît
 Ecole Primaire Maurice-L.-Duplessis
 Ecole Primaire Monseigneur-Forget
 Ecole Primaire Paul-Chagnon
 Ecole Primaire Saint-Joseph
 Ecole Primaire Socrates
 École Primaire Mille-Sports

The South Shore Protestant Regional School Board previously served the municipality.

Transportation

Airport
The borough has a medium-sized airport known as Montréal/St-Hubert Airport. In terms of aircraft movements, it is among the busiest in Canada. The airport was once the location of a Canadian Air Force Base which ceased operation in 1995, but which continues to use the area. The airport includes a weather station, next to which stands the headquarters of the Canadian Space Agency.

Rail
Saint-Hubert is served by the Longueuil–Saint-Hubert commuter rail station on the Réseau de transport métropolitain's Mont-Saint-Hilaire line.

Important roads
 Grande-Allée
 Taschereau Boulevard
 Cousineau Boulevard 
 Chemin Chambly
 Payer Boulevard 
 Mountainview Boulevard 
 Kimber / Maricourt Boulevards
 Gaëtan Boucher Boulevard

Sister cities
Saint-Nazaire, France (1991)

Notable people
Gaétan Boucher, speedskater
Jon Lajoie, comedian
Irina Lazareanu, model
Patrick Leduc, soccer player
Kaytranada, DJ and producer
Marie-Claude Molnar, paralympic cyclist

See also
 List of municipalities in Quebec
 Municipal reorganization in Quebec
 List of mayors of Longueuil, Quebec
 Longueuil City Council
Pratt, Michel Longueuil 1657-2007. Les Éditions Histoire Québec, collection Société historique et culturelle du Marigot, 2008

Pratt, Michel Dictionnaire historique de Longueuil, Les Éditions Histoire Québec, collection Société historique et culturelle du Marigot. 2012

Notes

References

External links
Official website for former city of Saint-Hubert (archives)
The Montreal & Southern Counties Railway (from the memoirs of V.M. Manning)
Publications en ligne (Société historique et culturelle du Marigot)

Former municipalities in Quebec
Boroughs of Longueuil
Populated places disestablished in 2002